"The Chemicals" is a stand-alone single released by alternative rock band Garbage for Record Store Day 2015. The song is the first track recorded by the band during sessions for their sixth album to be released. "The Chemicals" features Brian Aubert (of Silversun Pickups) on co-vocals. Drummer Butch Vig described "The Chemicals" as "a very dense Garbage track".

Nylon magazine gave a positive write-up to "The Chemicals", declaring that the song "flaunts Shirley Manson's signature sultry vocals in a simple, building chorus that teems with anticipation, ready to erupt into a burst of head-banging bass and percussion."

In 2021, both "The Chemicals" and "On Fire" would be included on the deluxe edition bonus disc of Garbage's seventh album, No Gods No Masters.

Single release
For Record Store Day 2015, the vinyl "The Chemicals" single was pressed to 10" fluorescent orange vinyl and backed with a new cut titled "On Fire". The sleeve art was designed by Ryan Corey for Smog Design, from a traditional 19th century Mexican retablo depicting the Catholic church iconography of the "anima sola", or lonely soul in purgatory.

In the United States, "The Chemicals" was listed as a ‘Record Store Day Exclusive’ release, and limited to 4,000 units. In terms of sales, the single was the #46 biggest selling RSD release of that year. In the United Kingdom, the pressing was limited to 500 copies, and sold enough copies to debut at #49 on the Physical Singles chart. The following week sales sent the single up to #33, and a debut at #32 on the Vinyl Singles chart. A worldwide digital release of the two tracks followed on June 2, under the title "The Chemicals / On Fire".

"The Chemicals" is the third consecutive single release recorded specially by Garbage for Record Store Day, following their previous years' "Girls Talk", and 2013's cover version of "Because the Night"; in 2012, there were also RSD pressings of Not Your Kind of People singles "Blood for Poppies"" and "Battle In Me".

Music video
Acclaimed music video director Sophie Muller created a visual clip for "The Chemicals", by editing together footage of her family and friends shot at a London nightclub with the audio track. Manson and Muller had discussed the aesthetics of small punk rock clubs, and their demise over the prior thirty or so years. Both women had experienced such concerts in their formative years: "sweaty excitement... the sensuality that comes when you cram people in such a tiny space." Muller offered to cut the footage she had to "The Chemicals".

The music video premiered on the Mashable website on April 15, 2015. KROQ commended the use of underground rave imagery, and of the European/Berlin club scene that the visuals evoke, as well as Muller's shots and editing.

Commercial track listings
10" single STNVOL011 (Record Store Day release)
Digital single (titled "The Chemicals / On Fire")

 "The Chemicals" – 4:20
 "On Fire" – 5:07

Release history

Comprehensive charts

References

External links
 

Garbage (band) songs
2015 singles
2015 songs
Music videos directed by Sophie Muller
Songs written by Shirley Manson
Songs written by Duke Erikson
Songs written by Steve Marker
Songs written by Butch Vig